Tyrnyauz (Tırnıawuz) is a town and the administrative center of Elbrussky District of the Kabardino-Balkarian Republic, Russia, located on the main road leading to the Upper Baksan valley area and on the main climbing route for Mount Elbrus. Population:  Tyrnyauz is the largest town in the Baksan Valley and an essential provisioning point for trips into the Elbrus region.

History
It was founded around a tungsten mine and processing plant, which still stands but is no longer in operation. Town status was granted in 1955. In July 2000, the town was devastated by a massive flood and mudslide. Apartment blocks were buried in mud up to the fourth floor. No reliable figures exist for the number of casualties. The town has largely recovered as of 2004, but scars are still clearly visible.

Administrative and municipal status
Within the framework of administrative divisions, Tyrnyauz serves as the administrative center of Elbrussky District, to which it is directly subordinated. As a municipal division, the town of Tyrnyauz is incorporated within Elbrussky Municipal District as Tyrnyauz Urban Settlement.

Demographics
Population: .

Ethnic composition
As of the 2002 Census, the ethnic distribution of the population was:
Balkars: 47.3%
Russians: 25.3%
Kabardins: 16.1%
Ukrainians: 1.4%
Ossetians: 1.0%
Other ethnicities: 8.9%

Notable residents
Tyrnyauz is the birthplace of Valery Kokov, former President of the Kabardino-Balkarian Republic.

References

Notes

Sources

Cities and towns in Kabardino-Balkaria